The 2022–23 Wellington Phoenix season is the club's second season in the A-League Women, the premier competition for women's football in Australia, originally known as the W-League. 

On 25 May, Wellington Phoenix announced that head coach Gemma Lewis had signed a one-year contract extension with the club. However, four months later Lewis departed to take up a job in her homeland with the Football Association of Wales, and assistant coach Natalie Lawrence replaced her as head coach. The following month, Lawrence appointed Callum Holmes as assistant coach and Maia Vink as the team analyst and second assistant coach, later confirming the rest of the  staff with only the strength and conditioning coach, Daniel Gordon, retained.

Players

First-team squad

Transfers in

From academy squad

Transfers out

Contract extensions

A-League

League table

Matches

 All times are in NZST

Results summary

Results by round

External links

See also
2022–23 Wellington Phoenix FC season

Notes

References 

Wellington Phoenix FC (A-League Women)